The women's 60 metres at the 2016 IAAF World Indoor Championships took place on March 19, 2016.

Coming into these championships, world 200 champion Dafne Schippers and Barbara Pierre shared the fastest time in the world at 7.00.  During the heats both ran 7.02, but in the semis, Schippers' slow start made her vulnerable as Elaine Thompson beat her to the line.

In the final, the start proved to be important, Pierre got out well with Thompson, Michelle-Lee Ahye and Asha Philip.  The number 4 sprinter in the season Marie Josée Ta Lou was literally left in the blocks, yet 5 steps into the race, she had drawn even with Schippers.  After spotting the leaders a step, Schippers got into her superior top end speed and ran down everybody, except Pierre,  Thompson losing silver in the last step.

Results

Heats
Qualification: First 3 (Q) and next 6 fastest (q) qualified for the semifinals.

Semifinals
Qualification: First 2 (Q) and next 2 fastest (q) qualified for the final.

Final
The final was started at 19:53.

References

60 metres
60 metres at the World Athletics Indoor Championships
2016 in women's athletics